This is a list of populated places in the Pakistan province of Punjab.

 
Punjab